

Events
 Founding of Erebuni Fortress, namesake of Yerevan, Armenia, by Argishti I of Urartu

Births

Deaths
Zhou xuan wang, King of the Zhou Dynasty of China.

References